Thiago Almeida (born 14 January 1980) is a Brazilian rower. He competed in the men's lightweight double sculls event at the 2008 Summer Olympics.

References

External links
 

1980 births
Living people
Brazilian male rowers
Olympic rowers of Brazil
Rowers at the 2008 Summer Olympics
Sportspeople from Espírito Santo